The men's +100 kilograms (Heavyweight) competition at the 1998 Asian Games in Bangkok was held on 10 December 1998 at the Thammasat Gymnasium 1.

Schedule
All times are Indochina Time (UTC+07:00)

Results
Legend
DEC — Won by decision
IPP — Won by ippon
YUK — Won by yuko

Main bracket

Repechage

References 

Results
Top 8

M99
Judo at the Asian Games Men's Heavyweight